Bella Vista is the largest village in the Toledo District of Belize. According to the 2010 census, Bella Vista had a population of 3,508 people. It is located ten miles south-west of Independence and Mango Creek and fifty miles north of Punta Gorda the district's capital. Its neighbouring village is San Isidro which is considerably smaller.

References

Populated places in Toledo District
Toledo East